The 2019–20 Premier League of Eswatini was the 2019–20 season of the Premier League of Eswatini, the top-tier football league in Eswatini (formerly Swaziland), since its establishment in 1971. The season started on 17 August 2019 and Round 18 was completed on 1 March 2020 before being suspended due to the COVID-19 pandemic in Eswatini. In August 2020, the Eswatini Football Association decided to abandon the season, with winners and promotion being decided by the log positions at the time of the suspension, and with no relegations.

League table

References

Football leagues in Eswatini
Premier League
Premier League
Eswatini
Eswatini Premier League, 2019-20